Chaetorellia conjuncta is a species of tephritid or fruit flies in the genus Chaetorellia of the family Tephritidae.

Distribution
Albania & Kazakhstan South to Egypt & Pakistan.

References

Tephritinae
Insects described in 1913
Taxa named by Theodor Becker
Diptera of Asia